Alex Tapscott (born 1986) is a Canadian business author, and advisory board member. His work revolves around the applications of blockchain technology and cryptocurrencies like bitcoin.

He was the CEO and founder of NextBlock Global, a cryptocurrency investment company, and is the co-founder, with his father Don Tapscott, of the Blockchain Research Institute.

Early life and education
Tapscott was born in Toronto and attended Upper Canada College. He holds a BA in Law, Jurisprudence and Social thought from Amherst College in Amherst, Massachusetts where he graduated in 2008.

Tapscott represented Canada as a member (and captain) of the Canadian Men's Rugby Under-21 Team in numerous tournaments in 2006 and 2007.

Career
Tapscott co-authored, with his father Don Tapscott, the 2016 book Blockchain Revolution: How the Technology Behind Bitcoin is Changing Money, Business, and the World. The book became a The Globe and Mail as well as Toronto Star bestseller. Financial Times reviewed the book and wrote "The Tapscotts provide a thorough, balanced and enlightening guide to the next big thing",.

In October 2016, Tapscott gave his first TEDx Talk at TEDxSanFrancisco. He currently sits on the Advisory Board to Elections Canada, the independent, non-partisan agency responsible for conducting federal elections and referendums. He also serves as an advisory board member at early-stage start-ups, including Paycase and nuco.
 
In the summer of 2016, Tapscott co-convened a meeting of blockchain stakeholders in Muskoka, Ontario to discuss governance of the whole blockchain ecosystem.

On November 5, 2017, he announced that NextBlock was forced to scrap IPO plans due to being dropped by their underwriter, CIBC, after the company is reported to have made false and misleading statements in its marketing materials.

Bibliography
"Realizing the Potential of Blockchain: A Multistakeholder Approach to the Stewardship of Blockchain and Cryptocurrencies," World Economic Forum White Paper, 2017.
Blockchain Revolution: How the Technology Behind Bitcoin is Changing Money, Business, and the World, PenguinRandomHouse, 2016. .
A Bitcoin Governance Network, Global Solution Networks White Paper, 2014. 
To the Breaking Point: Law and Political Emergency, UD-ALO Publishing, 2010.

References

External links

1986 births
Living people
Upper Canada College alumni
Amherst College alumni
Canadian technology writers
People associated with cryptocurrency